Blennius is a Genus of combtooth blenny in the family Blenniidae. Its members include Blennius ocellaris, the Butterfly Blenny.

Species
There are currently two recognized species in this genus:
Blennius normani Poll, 1949
Blennius ocellaris Linnaeus, 1758 (Butterfly Blenny)

References

 
Blenniinae
Extant Miocene first appearances